Carabus vigil, is a species of ground beetle in the large genus Carabus.

References 

vigil
Insects described in 1898